The Holy Kinship was the extended family of Jesus descended from his maternal grandmother Saint Anne from her trinubium or three marriages.  The group were a popular subject in religious art throughout Germany and the Low Countries, especially during the late 15th and early 16th centuries, but rarely after the Council of Trent.  According to medieval tradition, Saint Anne, the mother of the Virgin Mary, was grandmother not just to Jesus but also to five of the twelve apostles: John the Evangelist, James the Greater, James the Less, Simon and Jude. These apostles, together with John the Baptist, were all cousins of Jesus. 

Smaller groups of Jesus and his parents, often plus his cousin John the Baptist and John's mother Elizabeth (Gospel of Luke ) and perhaps Saint Anne, are known as the Holy Family, and were considerably more common in art.

The first theologian to set forth the concept of the trinubium was Haymo of Halberstadt in his Historiae sacrae epitome, in which he outlined the family tree described above.  This list totals 17 people, all of whom might be shown, plus sometimes others.  The Geertgen tot Sint Jans has nineteen figures.  Although the character of the older generations is matriarchal, notably, the youngest generation, shown as children, are all male. They often carry their attributes, as do the three boys in the centre of the Geertgen: the saw (Simon), barrel (James the Great) and chalice (John the Evangelist).

The Council of Trent dismissed the legend of the three marriages of Anne, and the full subject was thereafter rarely painted, although the limited group of the families of the cousins Jesus and John the Baptist remained in use.

Anne's descendants
The basis for this family tree rests upon the trinubium, the tradition that Anne had married three times, and had had three daughters, the  Three Marys, each called Mary and with different fathers. The exact lineage, as laid out in Jacobus de Voragine’s Golden Legend (Latin: Legenda Aurea), runs thus:

Anna solet dici tres concepisse Marias,
Quas genuere viri Joachim, Cleophas, Salomeque.
Has duxere viri Joseph, Alpheus, Zebedeus.
Prima parit Christum, Jacobum secunda minorem,
Et Joseph justum peperit cum Simone Judam,
Tertia majorem Jacobum volucremque Johannem.

(Anna is usually said to have conceived three Marys,
Whom her husbands Joachim, Cleophas, and Salome begot.
These [Marys] the men Joseph, Alpheus, and Zebedee took in marriage.
The first bore Christ; the second bore James the Less,
Joseph the Just, with Simon [and] Jude;
The third, James the Greater and the winged John.)

Extra figures may relate to a local Dutch legendary genealogy which held that Anne’s sister, Hismeria (or Esmeria), was the mother of John the Baptist’s mother Elizabeth and of a second child, Eliud, who was in turn the grandfather of Servatius of Tongeren, a 4th-century bishop in the Netherlands.

Gallery

Notes

References 
Hall, James, Hall's Dictionary of Subjects and Symbols in Art, 1996 (2nd edn.), John Murray, 

Christian iconography

Family of Jesus